The 1968 Major League Baseball (MLB) draft took place prior to the 1968 MLB season. The draft saw the New York Mets take shortstop Tim Foli first overall.

First round selections

The following are the first round picks in the 1968 Major League Baseball draft.

* Did not sign

Other notable selections

* Did not sign

Notes

External links 
Complete draft list from The Baseball Cube database

References 

Major League Baseball draft
Draft